
Gmina Godzianów is a rural gmina (administrative district) in Skierniewice County, Łódź Voivodeship, in central Poland.

Villages
Gmina Godzianów contains the villages and settlements of Byczki, Godzianów, Kawęczyn, Lnisno, Płyćwia and Zapady.

Neighbouring gminas
Gmina Godzianów is bordered by the gminas of Głuchów, Lipce Reymontowskie, Maków, Skierniewice and Słupia.

References
Polish official population figures 2006

Godzianow
Skierniewice County